Dennis Ross Bermudez (born December 13, 1986) is a retired American mixed martial artist who competed in the Featherweight division of the UFC. Bermudez has been a professional MMA competitor since 2009. He has made a name for himself mainly fighting on the east coast. He was a competitor on Spike TV's The Ultimate Fighter: Team Bisping vs. Team Miller.

Wrestling
Bermudez began wrestling in 2000. Coached by Scott Wickham, he held a high school record of 112 wins and 23 losses.  From high school he went on to wrestle at Bloomsburg University of Pennsylvania where in 2007 he was ranked 22nd in the nation at the Division 1 level. Bermudez then became a college free-style All-American in Akron, Ohio.

Mixed martial arts career

Early career
Bermudez first started training mixed martial arts in Saugerties, New York, his home town, in 2009. He later went on to train at Blackman MMA in Harrisburg, Pennsylvania. He trained at Blackman MMA for nearly two years as he competed as an amateur and professional. Bermudez competed in four amateur bouts before earning his professional license, finishing his amateur career with four wins and no losses. He began his pro career in 2009, opening his career with a record of 4-0, all four won via stoppage. The wins earned him a fight for Russian promotion, M-1 Global. The fight was held at the event M-1 Selection 2010 in New Jersey against Kevin Roddy. Bermudez controlled the entirety of the fight and won via unanimous decision. He was not selected to compete in the M-1 Global tournament, and never returned to fight for the promotion.

Bermudez returned to Pennsylvania Fighting Championships for one fight before signing with Shine Fights. Bermudez signed onto compete in Shine Fights 2010 Lightweight Grand Prix. His first fight in the tournament was against UFC veteran Shannon Gugerty. Bermudez won the fight via unanimous decision and moved onto fight UFC, MFC, Strikeforce, and DREAM veteran, Drew Fickett. Fickett handed Bermudez his first loss, submitting him in the first round via rear naked choke. He lost his second straight fight, also via rear naked choke, to undefeated Jordan Rinaldi. After the losses, Bermudez showed interest in dropping weight classes to compete at featherweight.

The Ultimate Fighter

In 2011, Bermudez signed with the Ultimate Fighting Championship to compete in The Ultimate Fighter: Team Bisping vs. Team Miller. In the first episode, Bermudez fought reigning King of the Cage bantamweight champion, Jimmie Rivera, to gain entry into the Ultimate Fighter house. After being rocked in the first round, Bermudez defeated Rivera in the second round via TKO.

Bermudez was selected to be a part of Team Mayhem as the team's first pick (second overall). In his quarterfinal bout, Bermudez fought Stephen Bass. Bermudez controlled the fight throughout round one before winning the fight in the second round via TKO.

Bermudez was selected to fight Team Bisping member Akira Corassani in the semi-finals. After being knocked down twice, Bermudez took Corassani down and finished the fight in the first round via submission due to a guillotine choke. With the win, Bermudez moved into the finals set to take place at The Ultimate Fighter 14 Finale. The submission also won Bermudez an additional $25,000 for the fan voted "Submission of the Season".

Ultimate Fighting Championship
Bermudez officially made his UFC debut on December 3, 2011, at The Ultimate Fighter 14 Finale against Diego Brandão to determine the winner of The Ultimate Fighter 14. After a back-and-forth first round Bermudez knocked down Brandão and displayed strong ground and pound from the top position but while doing so Bermudez was caught in an armbar that ended the fight. The bout earned Fight of the Night honors, giving Bermudez an extra $40,000 in bonuses.

Bermudez next faced Pablo Garza at UFC on Fox 3 on May 5, 2012. He won the fight via unanimous decision.

Bermudez fought Tommy Hayden on August 11, 2012, at UFC 150. Bermudez won late into round one after clipping Hayden with a front kick to the chest, a straight right to the face then catching him in a guillotine choke, causing Hayden to submit.  The performance earned Bermudez Submission of the Night honors.

Bermudez next faced Matt Grice on February 23, 2013, at UFC 157. Bermudez won via split decision. The back and forth action earned both fighters Fight of the Night honors and much praise from MMA observers proclaiming it was an early front runner for "Fight of the Year".

Bermudez faced Max Holloway on May 25, 2013, at UFC 160. He won the fight via split decision.

Bermudez was briefly scheduled to face Nik Lentz on November 6, 2013, at UFC Fight Night 31.  However, Lentz was pulled from the pairing with Bermudez in favor of a bout with Chad Mendes on December 14, 2013, at UFC on Fox 9.  Bermudez instead fought Steven Siler as a replacement opponent. He won the fight via unanimous decision.

Bermudez next faced Jimy Hettes on March 15, 2014, at UFC 171. He won the fight via TKO in the third round and won his first Performance of the Night bonus award.

In his highest profile fight to date, Bermudez faced Clay Guida on July 26, 2014, at UFC on Fox 12. He won the bout via submission in the second round, and earned a Performance of the Night bonus award for the second time in a row.

Bermudez faced Ricardo Lamas on November 15, 2014, at UFC 180. He lost the fight via submission in the first round.

Bermudez faced Jeremy Stephens on July 11, 2015, at UFC 189. After a close first two rounds, he lost the fight by TKO in the third round.

Bermudez was expected to face Maximo Blanco on January 17, 2016, at UFC Fight Night 81. However, Bermudez pulled out of the fight in early December citing injury and was replaced by promotional newcomer Luke Sanders. Following a quick recovery, Bermudez was rebooked and he faced Tatsuya Kawajiri on February 21, 2016, at UFC Fight Night 83.  He won the fight by unanimous decision.

Bermudez faced Rony Jason on August 6, 2016, at UFC Fight Night 92. He won the fight by unanimous decision.

Bermudez faced returning veteran Chan Sung Jung on February 4, 2017, at UFC Fight Night 104. He lost the fight by knockout in the first round.

Bermudez faced Darren Elkins on July 22, 2017, at UFC on Fox 25. He lost the back-and-forth fight via split decision.

Bermudez faced Andre Fili on January 27, 2018 at UFC on Fox 27.  He lost the fight via split decision.

Bermudez faced Rick Glenn on July 14, 2018 at UFC Fight Night 133.  He lost the fight via split decision.

Bermudez faced Te Edwards in a lightweight bout on January 19, 2019 at UFC Fight Night 143. He won the fight via unanimous decision. He announced his retirement after the fight, leaving his gloves in the Octagon.

Personal life
Bermudez has two sons, Bryson and Maddox.

Championships and accomplishments
Ultimate Fighting Championship
Submission of the Season (The Ultimate Fighter 14) 
Fight of the Night (two times)
Submission of the Night (one time)
Performance of the Night (two times)

Mixed martial arts record

|-
|Win
|align=center|17–9
|Te Edwards
|Decision (unanimous)
|UFC Fight Night: Cejudo vs. Dillashaw 
|
|align=center|3
|align=center|5:00
|Brooklyn, New York, United States
|
|- 
|Loss
|align=center|16–9
|Rick Glenn
|Decision (split)
|UFC Fight Night: dos Santos vs. Ivanov 
|
|align=center|3
|align=center|5:00
|Boise, Idaho, United States
|
|-
|Loss
|align=center|16–8
|Andre Fili
|Decision (split)
|UFC on Fox: Jacaré vs. Brunson 2 
|
|align=center|3
|align=center|5:00
|Charlotte, North Carolina, United States
|
|-
|Loss
|align=center|16–7
|Darren Elkins
|Decision (split)
|UFC on Fox: Weidman vs. Gastelum 
|
|align=center|3
|align=center|5:00
|Uniondale, New York, United States
|
|-
|Loss
|align=center|16–6
|Chan Sung Jung
|KO (punch)
|UFC Fight Night: Bermudez vs. The Korean Zombie
|
|align=center|1
|align=center|2:49	
|Houston, Texas, United States
| 
|-
|Win
|align=center|16–5
|Rony Jason 
|Decision (unanimous)
|UFC Fight Night: Rodríguez vs. Caceres 
|
|align=center|3
|align=center|5:00
|Salt Lake City, Utah, United States
|
|-
|Win
|align=center|15–5
|Tatsuya Kawajiri
|Decision (unanimous)
|UFC Fight Night: Cowboy vs. Cowboy
|
|align=center|3
|align=center|5:00
|Pittsburgh, Pennsylvania, United States
|
|-
| Loss
| align=center| 14–5
| Jeremy Stephens
| TKO (flying knee and punches)
| UFC 189 
| 
| align=center| 3
| align=center| 0:32
| Las Vegas, Nevada, United States
| 
|-
| Loss
| align=center| 14–4
| Ricardo Lamas
| Submission (guillotine choke)
| UFC 180
| 
| align=center| 1
| align=center| 3:18
| Mexico City, Mexico
| 
|-
| Win
| align=center| 14–3
| Clay Guida
| Submission (rear-naked choke)
| UFC on Fox: Lawler vs. Brown
| 
| align=center| 2
| align=center| 2:57
| San Jose, California, United States
| 
|-
| Win
| align=center| 13–3
| Jimy Hettes
| TKO (punches and knee)
| UFC 171
| 
| align=center| 3
| align=center| 2:57
| Dallas, Texas, United States
| 
|-
| Win
| align=center| 12–3
| Steven Siler
| Decision (unanimous)
| UFC: Fight for the Troops 3
| 
| align=center| 3
| align=center| 5:00
| Fort Campbell, Kentucky, United States
| 
|-
| Win
| align=center| 11–3
| Max Holloway
| Decision (split)
| UFC 160
| 
| align=center| 3
| align=center| 5:00
| Las Vegas, Nevada, United States
| 
|-
| Win
| align=center| 10–3
| Matt Grice
| Decision (split)
| UFC 157
| 
| align=center| 3
| align=center| 5:00
| Anaheim, California, United States
| 
|-
| Win
| align=center| 9–3
| Tommy Hayden
| Submission (guillotine choke)
| UFC 150
| 
| align=center| 1
| align=center| 4:43
| Denver, Colorado, United States
| 
|-
| Win
| align=center| 8–3
| Pablo Garza
| Decision (unanimous)
| UFC on Fox: Diaz vs. Miller
| 
| align=center| 3
| align=center| 5:00
| East Rutherford, New Jersey, United States
| 
|-
| Loss
| align=center| 7–3
| Diego Brandão
| Submission (straight armbar)
| The Ultimate Fighter: Team Bisping vs. Team Miller Finale
| 
| align=center| 1
| align=center| 4:51
| Las Vegas, Nevada, United States
| 
|-
| Loss
| align=center| 7–2
| Jordan Rinaldi
| Submission (rear-naked choke)
| PA Fighting Championships 4
| 
| align=center| 1
| align=center| 2:13
| Harrisburg, Pennsylvania, United States
| 
|-
| Loss
| align=center| 7–1
| Drew Fickett
| Submission (rear-naked choke)
| Shine Fights 3
| 
| align=center| 1
| align=center| 2:02
| Newkirk, Oklahoma, United States
| 
|-
| Win
| align=center| 7–0
| Shannon Gugerty
| Decision (unanimous)
| Shine Fights 3 
| 
| align=center| 3
| align=center| 5:00
| Newkirk, Oklahoma, United States
| 
|-
| Win
| align=center| 6–0
| Joey Carroll
| Decision (unanimous)
| PA Fighting Championships 3
| 
| align=center| 3
| align=center| 5:00
| Harrisburg, Pennsylvania, United States
| 
|-
| Win
| align=center| 5–0
| Kevin Roddy
| Decision (unanimous)
| M-1 Selection 2010: The Americas Round 1 
| 
| align=center| 3
| align=center| 5:00
| Atlantic City, New Jersey, United States
| 
|-
| Win
| align=center| 4–0
| Jeremiah Gurley
| TKO (punches)
| Deathroll MMA 2
| 
| align=center| 1
| align=center| 1:55
| Monessen, Pennsylvania, United States
| 
|-
| Win
| align=center| 3–0
| Marcos Maciel
| TKO (punches)
| PA Fighting Championships 2
| 
| align=center| 1
| align=center| 2:57
| Harrisburg, Pennsylvania, United States
| 
|-
| Win
| align=center| 2–0
| Jimmy Seipel
| Submission (guillotine choke)
| Asylum Fight League 25
| 
| align=center| 2
| align=center| 0:41
| Philadelphia, Pennsylvania, United States
| 
|-
| Win
| align=center| 1–0
| Chris Connor
| TKO (punches)
| PA Fighting Championships 1
| 
| align=center| 1
| align=center| 4:01
| Harrisburg, Pennsylvania, United States
|

Mixed martial arts exhibition record

| Win
| align=center| 3–0
| Akira Corassani
| Submission (guillotine choke)
| The Ultimate Fighter: Team Bisping vs. Team Miller
|  (airdate)
| align=center| 1
| align=center| 3:12
| Las Vegas, Nevada, United States
| 
|-
| Win
| align=center| 2–0
| Stephen Bass
| TKO (punches)
| The Ultimate Fighter: Team Bisping vs. Team Miller
|  (airdate)
| align=center| 2
| align=center| 2:58
| Las Vegas, Nevada, United States
| 
|-
| Win
| align=center| 1–0
| Jimmie Rivera
| TKO (punches)
| The Ultimate Fighter: Team Bisping vs. Team Miller
|  (airdate)
| align=center| 2
| align=center| 1:40
| Las Vegas, Nevada, United States
|

See also
 List of current UFC fighters
 List of male mixed martial artists

References

External links
 
 

1986 births
American male mixed martial artists
American sportspeople of Puerto Rican descent
Living people
Mixed martial artists from New York (state)
Mixed martial artists utilizing boxing
Mixed martial artists utilizing collegiate wrestling
People from Saugerties, New York
People from Ulster County, New York
Ultimate Fighting Championship male fighters